Susan Tyrrell (born Susan Jillian Creamer; March 18, 1945 – June 16, 2012) was an American character actress. Tyrrell's career began in theater in New York City in the 1960s in Broadway and off Broadway productions. Her first film was Shoot Out (1971). She was nominated for the Academy Award for Best Supporting Actress for her performance as Oma in John Huston's Fat City (1972). In 1978, Tyrrell received the Saturn Award for Best Supporting Actress for her performance in Andy Warhol's Bad (1977). Her New York Times obituary described her as "a whiskey-voiced character actress (with) talent for playing the downtrodden, outré, and grotesque."

Early life
Tyrrell was born in San Francisco, California, to a British mother, Gillian (née Tyrrell; 1913–2012), and an American father, John Belding Creamer. Her mother was a socialite and member of the diplomatic corps in China and the Philippines during the 1930s and 1940s. Her father John was an agent with the William Morris Agency who represented Leo Carrillo, Loretta Young, Ed Wynn, and Carole Lombard.

Tyrrell spent her childhood in New Canaan, Connecticut. She was a poor student and as a teenager became estranged from her mother. Through her father's connections, Tyrrell was employed in the theatrical production of Time Out for Ginger (1963) starring Art Carney in New York City. Her father also persuaded Look magazine to follow her as she toured with the show, but he died shortly afterwards.

Career

Tyrrell made her Broadway debut in 1965 as a replacement performer in the comedy Cactus Flower. In 1968, as a member of the Repertory Theatre of Lincoln Center, she was in the cast of King Lear and revivals of The Time of Your Life (1969) and Camino Real (1970). Off-Broadway, Tyrrell appeared in the 1967 premiere of Lanford Wilson's The Rimers of Eldritch and a 1979 production of Father's Day at The American Place Theatre.

Tyrrell's television debut was in Mr. Novak (1964) and her film debut was in Shoot Out (1971). Tyrrell was nominated for an Academy Award for Best Supporting Actress for her performance as Oma in John Huston's Fat City (1972). In 1976, she played a psychotic character in I Never Promised You A Rose Garden. In 1978, she won the Saturn Award for Best Supporting Actress for her performance in Bad.

Later, Tyrrell starred as Queen Doris in the indie Forbidden Zone (1980). She sang the film's song, "Witch's Egg". A year later, she portrayed Vera in Tales of Ordinary Madness (1981). From 1981 to 1982, Tyrrell starred as Gretchen Feester, in the ABC's short-lived situation comedy series Open All Night. She then had a starring role in the exploitation horror film Night Warning (1981).

In 1983 Tyrrell played Solly in the sexploitation film Angel and its 1984 sequel, Avenging Angel. Then followed roles in the adventure film Flesh+Blood, the Vincent Price anthology horror film From a Whisper to a Scream (1987), the animated feature film The Chipmunk Adventure (1987), and Big Top Pee-wee (the 1988 sequel to 1985's Pee-wee's Big Adventure). Tyrrell took a supporting role in John Waters' Cry-Baby (1990).

In 1992, Tyrrell performed her own one-woman show, Susan Tyrrell: My Rotten Life, a Bitter Operetta. In the late 1990s, Tyrrell had roles in the Tales from the Crypt episode "Comes the Dawn" (1995), the animated series Extreme Ghostbusters (1997), and the psychological thriller film Buddy Boy (1999).

In the 2000s, Tyrrell appeared in Bob Dylan's Masked and Anonymous (2003) and The Devil's Due at Midnight (2004). Her final appearance was in the 2012 independent film Kid-Thing''.

Personal life
In the mid-1970s, Tyrrell had a two-year relationship with actor Hervé Villechaize and shared a home with him in the Laurel Canyon area of Los Angeles.

Tyrrell suffered from essential thrombocytosis, a disease of the blood. In early 2000, her disease necessitated bilateral below-knee amputations. That year, Johnny Depp hosted a benefit at the Viper Room to help defray Tyrrell's medical bills. Megan Mullally, Jack Black, and Chloe Webb attended.

In 2008, Tyrrell moved to Austin, Texas, to be closer to her niece. In January 2012, Tyrrell wrote in her journal, "I demand my death be joyful and I never return again." She died on June 16, 2012, in Austin. She was cremated and her ashes scattered.

Filmography

Film

Television

Theatre

Awards and nominations

Source:

References

External links
 
 
 
 LA Weekly: "My So-Called Rotten Life" by Paul Cullum (January 11, 2000)

1945 births
2012 deaths
American amputees
American film actresses
American stage actresses
American television actresses
American voice actresses
Actresses from San Francisco
Actresses from Los Angeles
20th-century American actresses
21st-century American actresses
Deaths from blood disease